Minoan may refer to the following:
 Minoan, having to do with King Minos
 Minoan civilization
 Minoan, the script known as Linear A
 the (undeciphered) Minoan language written in that script
 the Eteocretan language, probably a descendant thereof
 Minoan pottery
 Minoan eruption
 Minoan chronology
 Minoan seal-stones
 Minoan religion
 Minoan Modi, a peak sanctuary in eastern Crete
 Minoan Bull-leaper, a bronze in the British Museum
 Cypro-Minoan syllabary, a script used on Cyprus
 Minoan, an old name for the Mycenean language before it was deciphered and discovered to be a form of Greek
 Minoan frescoes from Tell el-Daba, ancient Egyptian frescos in Minoan style
 Minoa, name of several bronze-age settlements in the Aegean.
 Minoan Lines, a Greek ferry company
 Minoan Air, a Greek airline

Language and nationality disambiguation pages
History of Crete